Terrorizer was an American grindcore band formed in 1986 in Los Angeles, California.

History 
The group released its debut album, World Downfall, in 1989. It is seen as one of the classics of early grindcore. An album containing two rehearsal sessions of the band from 1987 was released in 2003.

The band split when David Vincent offered Pete Sandoval to be a member of Morbid Angel, while Pintado joined Napalm Death; Sandoval saw Terrorizer stagnating, while Morbid Angel and Napalm Death at the time were rapidly gaining popularity. As a result, only Garcia remained; Garcia claims not to have talked to Sandoval since.

In early 2005, it was rumored that Terrorizer were to reform with their original line-up; however, only Pintado and Sandoval returned. The band released its second studio album Darker Days Ahead in August 2006 on Century Media Records. Tony Norman joined on guitar and bass and Anthony Rezhawk joined as the new vocalist. Pintado had been recording and playing shows with Rezhawk's band Resistant Culture and asked him to join Terrorizer. In the week of the album's release, Pintado died due to complications arising from liver failure.

In 2009, Terrorizer released a new demo track, "Hordes of Zombies", on its MySpace page. In June 2011, Terrorizer signed to Season of Mist, and released its third album, Hordes of Zombies, on February 28, 2012. Resistant Culture guitarist Katina Culture replaced Pintado and David Vincent rejoined on bass.

In November 2012, Sandoval announced that Terrorizer started writing new material for their next album. The fourth album Caustic Attack was released in 2018 under The End Records.

On August 9, 2021, Earache Records announced a new worldwide record deal with Terrorizer, as well as revealing that a new album was in the works.

On January 22, 2023, Sandoval announced the split of Terrorizer and would shift his attention to his other band I Am Morbid.

Terrorizer LA 

In 2014, Oscar Garcia was invited by Jesse Pintado's sister to put together a new lineup of Terrorizer (his version known as Terrorizer LA or TLA) for a festival celebrating what would have been Jesse Pintado's 45th birthday. He asked fellow Nausea member Leon del Muerte (Murder Construct) to play guitar, and shortly afterward Cosmo Reveles, Rick Cortez (Sadistic Intent) and Mike Caffell (Dreaming Dead, Exhausted Prayer) were recruited to fill out the band. The band continues to play under the Terrorizer LA name.

Before The Downfall, a collection of demos and unreleased material, was released by FOAD Records in 2015.

Band members 

Final line-up
 Pete Sandoval – drums (1986–1989, 2005–2006, 2009-2023)
 Sam Molina – bass, vocals (2013–2023)
 Lee Harrison – guitars (2013–2023)

Previous members
 Oscar Garcia – vocals (1986–1989) guitar (1987–1989)
 Alfred "Garvey" Estrada – bass (1986–1988)
 Jesse Pintado – guitars (1986–1989, 2005–2006; his death)
 Tony Norman – bass (2005–2006, 2009–2011)
 David Vincent – bass (1989, 2011–2013)
 Anthony Rezhawk – vocals (2005–2006, 2009–2013)
 Katina Culture – guitars (2009–2013)

Timeline

Discography
Studio albums
World Downfall (1989)
Darker Days Ahead (2006)
Hordes of Zombies (2012)
Caustic Attack (2018)

Split releases
Terrorizer / Nausea (1988)

Demos
Nightmares (1987)
Demo '87 (1988)

References

External links
Official website
Official MySpace includes memorial to Jesse Pintado

1986 establishments in California
American grindcore musical groups
Century Media Records artists
Death metal musical groups from California
Deathgrind musical groups
Earache Records artists
Hardcore punk groups from California
Musical groups established in 1986
Musical groups reestablished in 2009
Season of Mist artists